Bessemer is a borough in Lawrence County, Pennsylvania, United States. The population was 1,073 at the 2020 census. It is part of the New Castle micropolitan area.

Geography
Bessemer is located at  (40.973960, -80.487517).

Demographics

As of the census of 2000, there were 1,172 people, 480 households, and 345 families residing in the borough. The population density was 701.1 people per square mile (271.0/km²). There were 496 housing units at an average density of 296.7 per square mile (114.7/km²). The racial makeup of the borough was 98.55% White, 0.51% African American, 0.43% Asian, and 0.51% from two or more races. Hispanic or Latino of any race were 0.77% of the population. In 2000 census 9.5% of population related Croatian backgrounds, the highest percentage of the population of any municipality in the United States.

There were 480 households, out of which 27.7% had children under the age of 18 living with them, 55.8% were married couples living together, 12.3% had a female householder with no husband present, and 28.1% were non-families. 25.0% of all households were made up of individuals, and 15.6% had someone living alone who was 65 years of age or older. The average household size was 2.44 and the average family size was 2.91.

In the borough the population was spread out, with 22.3% under the age of 18, 6.8% from 18 to 24, 28.0% from 25 to 44, 21.2% from 45 to 64, and 21.7% who were 65 years of age or older. The median age was 40 years. For every 100 females there were 89.3 males. For every 100 females age 18 and over, there were 88.6 males.

The median income for a household in the borough was $30,781, and the median income for a family was $35,250. Males had a median income of $32,024 versus $20,069 for females. The per capita income for the borough was $15,677. About 9.1% of families and 10.0% of the population were below the poverty line, including 16.0% of those under age 18 and 4.6% of those age 65 or over.

Notable people
Charley Burley, professional boxer
Frank M. Clark, U.S. Representative

See also
Mohawk Area School District

References

External links

Populated places established in 1913
Boroughs in Lawrence County, Pennsylvania
1913 establishments in Pennsylvania